Heidenmauer is German for "heathen wall" and may refer to:

 Heidenmauer (Palatinate), a Celtic ringwork in Rhineland-Palatinate, Germany
 The Heidenmauer, a novel by James Fenimore Cooper